Anton Geiss, German spelling Anton Geiß (11 August 1858 in Rettenbach – 3 March 1944 in Schriesheim) was a German politician in the Republic of Baden. He was a member of the SPD.

He served on Baden's local legislature, the Landtag, from 1895 to 1903 and from 1909 to 1921. He was the chairman of the SPD in Baden from 1908 until 1921.

Geiss also served in a number of executive offices in Baden. When the Republic was first created in 1918, he became Chairman of the Provisional Government, and on 2 April 1919 he became State President and Head of Government. He also served as Minister for Military Affairs until 1920.

|-

1858 births
1944 deaths
Members of the Second Chamber of the Diet of the Grand Duchy of Baden